Oksana Vashchuk (born 11 February 1989 in Ivanychi, Ukrainian SSR) is a female freestyle wrestler from Ukraine who participated in Women's freestyle wrestling 72 kg at 2008 Summer Olympics. She lost in 1/8 final to Maider Unda of Spain.

External links
 Athlete bio on beijing2008.com

Living people
1989 births
Ukrainian female sport wrestlers
Olympic wrestlers of Ukraine
Wrestlers at the 2008 Summer Olympics
European Games competitors for Ukraine
Wrestlers at the 2015 European Games
Sportspeople from Volyn Oblast
20th-century Ukrainian women
21st-century Ukrainian women